The , "The Chronicle of Yoshitsune", is a Japanese gunki monogatari ("war-tale") that focuses on the legends of Minamoto no Yoshitsune and his followers. Thought to have been written during the Nanboku-chō period, it has provided inspiration to numerous Noh, kabuki and bunraku plays. Much of the image that people today have of Yoshitsune and those associated with him (Saitō no Musashibō Benkei and Shizuka Gozen, for example) is considered to have been influenced by the Gikeiki.

History
The word "Gikeiki" literally means "The Record of Yoshitsune", but the on-yomi of the kanji for his name are used in reading it aloud – "yoshi" is read as "gi", and "tsune" is read "kei". The final part "ki" means record.

All previous texts of Gikeiki are essentially the same, there are no major variations. These fall into three categories:

 Manuscripts - These include texts with titles such as Hogan Monogatari and Yoshitsune Monogatari.
 Woodblock editions - The major woodblock printings were made in 1633, 1635, 1640, 1645, 1659, 1670, 1673, 1689, 1698, 1708, and 1724.
 Movable wooden print editions - There are four movable print editions ranging from 1600 to 1633.

Translations

See also
Heike Monogatari

References

External links
Gikeiki  (Japanese)

Japanese chronicles
Late Middle Japanese texts
Monogatari
14th-century history books
Works about Minamoto no Yoshitsune
Gunki monogatari